Gillett & Johnston was a clockmaker and bell foundry based in Croydon, England from 1844 until 1957. Between 1844 and 1950, over 14,000 tower clocks were made at the works. The company's most successful and prominent period of activity as a bellfounder was in the 1920s and 1930s, when it was responsible for supplying many important bells and carillons for sites across Britain and around the world.

A successor company continues operation in Bletchingley, Surrey, under the Gillett & Johnston name, engaged in clock-making and clock and carillon repair.

History

The company traced its roots to a clockmaking business established by William Gillett in Hadlow, Kent, in the early 19th century. In 1837, Gillett moved his business to Clerkenwell, London; and in 1844 to the site in what later became known as Union Road, Thornton Heath, Croydon, which would remain its home for the next 113 years. Charles Bland became a partner in 1854, and the company subsequently traded as Gillett & Bland. In 1877, Arthur A. Johnston (c.1851–1916) bought a partnership, and shortly afterwards extended the company's output by establishing a bell foundry. The business became known as Gillett, Bland & Co until Bland's death in c.1884, when the name was changed to Gillett & Co. The name Gillett & Johnston seems to have been used from around 1887.

Arthur Johnston's son, Cyril Frederick Johnston (1884–1950), joined the company in 1902, became a partner in 1907, and took over the firm following his father's death in 1916. He developed an interest in the theory of bell-tuning, and greatly expanded the bellfounding side of the business. In 1905 he redeveloped the works, and installed a large vertical tuning lathe. He was particularly interested in the manufacture of carillons, which presented special problems of tuning distinct from those of church bells.

During the First World War, the factory suspended its regular business and became involved in the manufacture of munitions, employing over 1,250 men and women.

The firm became a limited liability company in 1925, initially trading as the Croydon Bell Foundry Ltd (although the name "Gillett and Johnston" still appeared on bells). It reverted to the name Gillett & Johnston Ltd in 1930.

Cyril Johnston resigned as managing director in 1948, following disagreements over company policy, and died suddenly two years later in 1950. Following his departure, Henry Michael Howard took over, and some bells were cast in his name. The business also now diversified into other engineering activities, and new subsidiaries (Microcastings Ltd and Bourdon Tools Ltd) were established. However, it experienced financial difficulties, caused in part by changing architectural tastes, and a falling-off in demand for traditional tower clocks and cast bells. In 1957 the business was taken into receivership and the works were closed down.

Successor company
The business was sold in 1958 to the Bath Portland Group, which already owned Synchronome, a rival office clockmaking company. For a few years, the tower clock side was established in Wembley as Gillett-Johnston Clocks Ltd. In 1962 it was bought by Cecil Hector Coombes (d. 1972), who had previously worked for Gillett & Johnston in Croydon. He returned the firm to Croydon in 1963 as Gillett and Johnston (Croydon) Ltd, basing it first in Clarendon Road (1963–1970), and then in Sanderstead Road (1970–2012). In 2012 the company moved to new premises in Bletchingley, Surrey. It remains in the Coombes family, and undertakes clockmaking, and the restoration and maintenance of tower clocks, carillons and bells.

Union Road site
The company occupied the same site in Union Road, off Whitehorse Road, Thornton Heath, Croydon, from 1844 until the closure of the works in 1957. In 1868 a tall clock tower was built as a "working advertisement", and to provide a facility in which newly cast bells could be tested: this became a prominent local landmark. Each of the four clockfaces was different and unique. A carillon manufactured by the company was installed in the tower in 1920. After the company's closure in 1957, the premises were given over to other industrial uses. The main buildings, including the clock tower, were eventually demolished in 1997, the clockfaces having been removed and placed in storage. After some years standing vacant, part of the foundry building found a new purchaser in 2003 to become a church of the Emmanuel Inspirational Church of God. The greater part of the site is now occupied by a self-storage facility.

The "Mail Coach" pub on the corner of Union Road and Whitehorse Road was renamed "Ye Olde Clocktower" in memory of the firm and its works.

Archives
Surviving records of the foundry include a register of bells cast, 1877–1919; notes relating to work on bells, 1879–1907; and 17 volumes of bell tuning books, 1907–1951. They are now held at the Museum of Croydon (ref. AR 1).

Notable commissions

Bells
Ring of 9 bells for Reading Town Hall, Berkshire, 1879–1881. Supplied by Gillett, Bland and Co.
Chime of 8 bells for St Bartholomew's Church, Dublin, 1881. Supplied by Gillett, Bland and Co.
 Ring of 3 bells for Old City Hall, Toronto, Ontario, Canada, 1900. By Gillett and Johnston
Ring of 10 bells for Wimborne Minster, Dorset, 1911. The original brief was for the restoration of the historic ring of 8 bells, but Cyril Johnston persuaded the incumbent that the ring needed to be entirely recast. 
Carillon for Gillett & Johnston's own clocktower, Union Road, Croydon, 1920.
Carillon of 23 bells for the Metropolitan United Church, Toronto, Ontario, Canada, 1921. The carillon has since been enlarged by two other foundries in 1960 and 1971, and now numbers 54 bells.
The John Wanamaker Memorial Founder's Bell, a 16-ton tuned bell originally in the Wanamaker Building and now in the Lincoln-Liberty Building, Philadelphia, commissioned by Rodman Wanamaker in 1925 as a memorial to his father, John. At the time of its casting in 1926 it was the world's largest tuned bell. Originally it could be swung on special occasions; today a large hammer is used to strike the hours. Leopold Stokowski was one of the many admirers of its tone.
Carillon of 53 bells for the Peace Tower, Parliament Hill, Ottawa, Ontario, Canada, 1926.
Carillon of 23 bells for 24 Old Bond Street, London, UK, 1927
Ring of bells for Coventry Cathedral, 1927. The bells survived the bombing of the cathedral in 1940.
The Laura Spelman Rockefeller memorial carillon of 74 bells at the Riverside Church, New York City, 1928. The carillon contains the largest tuned bell in the world. The Low C "bourdon" of the carillon weighs 20 tons.
Carillon for Louvain University Library, 1928. 
Carillon of 49 bells for the National War Memorial, Wellington, New Zealand, 1929.
The Laura Spelman Rockefeller memorial carillon of 72 bells for Rockefeller Chapel, University of Chicago, 1930.
Recasting of "Bow Bells" (church of St Mary-le-Bow), London, 1933. These bells were destroyed by enemy action in 1941.
Carillon for Bournville, Birmingham, 1934.
Ring of 12 bells for Croydon Parish Church (now Croydon Minster), 1936.
Recasting of 10 bells for St Philip's Cathedral, Birmingham, 1937. A further two treble bells were cast in 1949.
The Freedom Bell, Rathaus Schöneberg, Berlin, Germany, 1950. The 10-ton bell was a gift from Americans to the city of Berlin as a symbol of anti-communism.
 The carillon of 36 bells in the tower of the Kirk of St Nicholas in Aberdeen was replaced with 47 bells in 1950.
Carillon for the Beaumont Tower, Michigan State University, 1957. This was the firm's last bell installation: the final 4 basses were cast at the foundry of John Taylor & Co, Loughborough, but tuned by Gillett & Johnston.

Clocks

Clock for Sarajevo Clock Tower, Sarajevo, 1873. By Gillett & Bland.
Clock for Manchester Town Hall, Manchester, 1879. By Gillett & Bland.
New movement for the Hampton Court astronomical clock, 1879. By Gillett & Bland.
Clock for Sydney Town Hall, Australia, 1884. By Gillett, Bland & Co.
Clock for Estação Cultura railway station, Campinas, Brazil, 1888.
Clock for Old City Hall, Toronto, Ontario, Canada, 1900. By Gillett and Johnston.
Clock for City Hall, Krugersdorp, South Africa, 1908. By Gillett & Johnston.
Clock for Torre Monumental, Buenos Aires, 1916.
Clock for Montreal Clock Tower, Montreal, 1922. By Gillett & Johnston.
Clock for Braintree Town Hall, Braintree, 1927. By Croydon Bell Foundry Ltd.
Clock for Selfridges, Oxford Street, London, 1931.
Clock for Shell Mex House, London, 1932: the largest public clock in London.
Clock for Tabriz City Hall, Tabriz, Iran, 1934. By Gillett and Johnston.
Clock for Misr Spinning and Weaving Company, El-Mahalla El-Kubra, Egypt, 1947. By Gillett and Johnston.

Gallery

References

Bibliography

 [primarily a biography of Cyril Johnston, the author's father]

External links

Youtube visit to the John Wanamaker Memorial Founder's Bell striking noon
Gillett & Johnston: website of the successor company

1844 establishments in England
1957 disestablishments in England
Bell foundries of the United Kingdom
British companies established in 1844
British companies disestablished in 1957
Buildings and structures demolished in 1997
Carillon makers
Clock manufacturing companies of the United Kingdom
Defunct manufacturing companies of the United Kingdom
History of the London Borough of Croydon
Manufacturing companies established in 1844
Manufacturing companies disestablished in 1957